Green Key may refer to:
 Green Key International, an eco-label based in Denmark
 Green Key Global, an industry-led eco-label based in Canada
 Green Key Books, a company who acquired the publishing rights to God's Word Translation
 Green Key Society, a student group at Dartmouth College, Hanover, New Hampshire, US
 Green Key Weekend, a Dartmouth College tradition
 Green Key Technologies, a major telephony key system used in financial trading turrets

See also 
 Green Cay National Wildlife Refuge, near Saint Croix, U.S. Virgin Islands